Arbër Basha (born 13 January 1998) is an Albanian footballer who plays as a midfielder for Kastrioti in the Kategoria Superiore in Albania.

Career

Narva Trans
Basha began his professional career in Kosovo, spending time in the youth ranks at Vllaznia before returning to his native Albania with Kamza, albeit making no first-team appearances. In June 2018, Basha moved to Estonian club Narva Trans. Basha's goal was to use the move to prompt an eventual transfer to the Russian Premier League. He made his competitive debut for the club on 12 July 2018 in a UEFA Europa League tie against Željezničar; a 2–0 defeat. He scored his first goal for the club in August of that year, the fifth in a 7–0 victory over SK Kadrina.

Kastrioti
In August 2019, Basha returned to Albania, joining then-Albanian First Division club Kastrioti. He made his competitive debut for the club on 14 September 2019 in a 3–2 victory over Egnatia.

International
In October 2018, Basha was called up to the Albania U21 team.

References

External links

1998 births
Living people
FC Kamza players
JK Narva Trans players
KS Kastrioti players
Kategoria e Parë players
Meistriliiga players
Albanian footballers
Albanian expatriate footballers
Association football midfielders
Albanian expatriate sportspeople in Estonia
Expatriate footballers in Estonia